Ludgershall Castle is a ruined 12th-century fortified royal residence at Ludgershall in Wiltshire, England. Three large walls still remain of the castle, which was turned into a hunting lodge by Henry III but fell into disuse by the 15th century. The ruin was listed as a Scheduled Ancient Monument in 1981.

Details and history
Extensive earthworks remain, although a private house stands on part of the site. The earthworks have been greatly altered by quarrying. The southern enclosure, which lies within them and at the opposite end of the site from the standing walls, is thought to have been an Iron Age stronghold.

A medieval castle was probably first built in the late 11th century by Edward of Salisbury, Sheriff of Wiltshire. By about 1100 it had come into the possession of the Crown, and John the Marshal (–1165) is recorded as the king's castellan. He strengthened it and may have added the northern enclosure, which contained the important buildings, largely in stone, including a great hall and a tower with royal living quarters. The southern enclosure was the bailey, where there were stables, kitchens, and timber farm buildings.

King John improved the castle as a hunting lodge in 1210, and Henry III made improvements to the castle between 1234 and 1251, such as the addition of the great hall in 1244; he visited the castle at least 21 times.

The castle was used less and less frequently in the 14th and 15th centuries, and by the 1540s most of its ruins had been demolished. The site was levelled to form a garden, with the surviving 12th-century tower kept as a garden feature.

Ludgershall was a more important place in medieval England than it is now, and was able to send two members to Parliament, a privilege it kept until the Reform Act of 1832.

The site was excavated for the first time between 1964 and 1972 by the University of Southampton. The ruin was listed as a Scheduled Ancient Monument in 1981.

See also
Castles in Great Britain and Ireland
List of castles in England

References

External links 

Castles in Wiltshire
English Heritage sites in Wiltshire
Ludgershall, Wiltshire